The Jardin Dominique Alexandre Godron is a historic botanical garden located at 3 rue Sainte-Catherine, Nancy, Meurthe-et-Moselle, Lorraine, France. It is open daily without charge.

The garden was founded in 1758 by Stanisław Leszczyński, the last Duke of Lorraine, as an adjunct to the Royal College of Medicine. It occupies .  It is the city's oldest botanical garden, and remained active as such until 1993 when its collections were transferred to the larger Jardin botanique du Montet outside the central city. It was named in honor of celebrated local botanist Dominique Alexandre Godron (1807-1880), who redesigned and reinvigorated the garden during his tenure as director, and now displays horticultural collections in its long, narrow beds.

See also 
 List of botanical gardens in France

References 

 Jardin Dominique Alexandre Godron
 Un peu d'histoire ou l'origine de la botanique à Nancy 
 Parcs et Jardins entry 

Godron, Jardin Dominique Alexandre
Godron, Jardin Dominique Alexandre
Nancy, France
Tourist attractions in Nancy, France
Buildings and structures in Nancy, France